PASCAL is a scientific bibliographic database, which is maintained by INIST (CNRS). PASCAL covers the core scientific literature in science, technology and medicine with a special emphasis on European literature.

, PASCAL maintains a database of more than 17 million records, 90% of which are author abstracts. Its coverage is from 1973 to present. Its source documents are composed of journal articles at 88% (3,085 international titles), proceedings at 9%, and dissertations, books, patents, and reports account combined for 3%.

References

External links 
 

Bibliographic databases and indexes
French National Centre for Scientific Research